Yang He (born 22 March 1990 in Dalian) is a Chinese football player who currently plays for China League One side Shaanxi Chang'an Athletic.

Club career
Yang started his professional football career in 2011 when he was promoted to Chinese Super League side Changchun Yatai's first team. On 30 April, he made his senior debut in a 1–1 away draw against Shaanxi Chanba, coming on as a substitute for Du Zhenyu in the 89th minute. He mainly played in the reserve team league and scored 10 goals in 2011 season. When Svetozar Šapurić was appointed as new manager of the club, he stated that Yang was not part of his plans. Yang was lined with Guangzhou Evergrande and Shenzhen Ruby, but finally was loaned to China League One side Chengdu Blades for a season. On 18 March, he made his debut for Chengdu in a 1–0 home victory against Hohhot Dongjin. He scored his first senior goal on 19 May which ensured Chengdu beat Yanbian Baekdu Tigers 3–2. He appeared 28 times for Chengdu in the 2012 season and returned to Changchun at the end of 2012. In February 2014, Yang was loaned to China League Two side Jiangxi Liansheng until 31 December 2014.

On 28 February 2015, Yang was loaned to China League Two side Meizhou Hakka until 31 December 2015. In February 2017, he was loaned to League Two side Hebei Elite until 31 December 2017.

Career statistics
Statistics accurate as of match played 31 December 2020.

Honours
Jiangxi Liansheng
China League Two: 2014

Meizhou Hakka
China League Two: 2015

References

External links

Living people
1990 births
Chinese footballers
Footballers from Dalian
Changchun Yatai F.C. players
Chengdu Tiancheng F.C. players
Jiangxi Beidamen F.C. players
Meizhou Hakka F.C. players
Shaanxi Chang'an Athletic F.C. players
Chinese Super League players
China League One players
China League Two players
Association football forwards